1977 Ugandan coup d'état attempt may refer to:

 Operation Mafuta Mingi in June 1977
 1977 invasion of Uganda in October 1977